Jazz standards refer to musical compositions that are an important part of the musical repertoire jazz musicians. They can also refer to:

Jazz Standard (jazz club), defunct jazz club in New York City
Great Jazz Standards, 1958 album by composer Gil Evans
The Jazz Standards: A Guide to the Repertoire, 2012 book by Ted Gioia

See also
List of jazz standards